The Shafer Building, also known as the Sixth and Pine Building, is a historic building in downtown Seattle, in the U.S. state of Washington. The structure is listed on the National Register of Historic Places.

See also

 National Register of Historic Places listings in Seattle

References

External links
 

Buildings and structures in Seattle
Downtown Seattle